Thomasia gardneri, commonly known as Mount Holland thomasia, is a species of flowering plant in the family Malvaceae and was endemic to a restricted area of Western Australia, but is now considered to be extinct. It was a low, erect shrub with scaly, narrowly egg-shaped leaves and racemes of pink flowers.

Description
Flowering was observed in September.

Taxonomy
Thomasia gardneri was first formally described in 1974 by Susan Paust in the journal Nuytsia from specimens collected by Charles Gardner in September 1929. The specific epithet (gardneri) honours the collector of the type specimens.

Distribution and habitat
The details of its habitat are not known.

Conservation status
Thomasia gardneri is listed as "extinct" under the Australian Government Environment Protection and Biodiversity Conservation Act 1999 and the Government of Western Australia Department of Biodiversity, Conservation and Attractions.

References

gardneri
Rosids of Western Australia
Plants described in 1974